John "Ian" Hunter is a Scottish former footballer who played mainly as a left back, primarily for Falkirk where he played for a decade, with his colleague at right-back typically being John Lambie.

There was another Ian Hunter who also played briefly for Falkirk in the same period, but was more closely associated with Dunfermline Athletic.

References

Year of birth unknown
20th-century births
Living people
Association football defenders
Scottish footballers
Falkirk F.C. players
Stenhousemuir F.C. players
Scottish Football League players
Year of birth missing (living people)